Badlands is an album by Canadian musician Dirty Beaches. It was released on March 28, 2011 by Zoo Music.

It was longlisted as a nominee for the 2011 Polaris Music Prize.

Track listing

References

2011 debut albums
Dirty Beaches albums